Clint Roberts may refer to:

Clint Roberts (politician) (1935 – 2017), South Dakota politician
Clint Roberts (broadcaster) (born 1987), New Zealand radio host